Smiskaret or Smiskardet is a village in the municipality of Malvik in Trøndelag county, Norway. Since 2002, it has been considered a part of the Hommelvik urban area.

References

Villages in Trøndelag
Malvik